Aleksandr Tkachenko (born 13 February 1971) is a Belarusian freestyle skier. He competed in the men's aerials event at the 1998 Winter Olympics.

References

1971 births
Living people
Belarusian male freestyle skiers
Olympic freestyle skiers of Belarus
Freestyle skiers at the 1998 Winter Olympics
Place of birth missing (living people)